The 1997 Midwestern Collegiate Conference men's basketball tournament took place at the end of the 1996–97 regular season. The tournament was hosted by Wright State.

Seeds
All Midwestern Collegiate Conference schools played in the tournament. Teams were seeded by 1996–97 Midwestern Collegiate Conference season record, with a tiebreaker system to seed teams with identical conference records.

Bracket

References

1997 Midwestern Collegiate Conference men's basketball tournament
Horizon League men's basketball tournament
Midwestern Collegiate Conference men's basketball tournament